Su hermana menor is a 1943 Argentine romantic comedy film, directed by Enrique Cahen Salaberry on his debut. It stars Silvia Legrand, Zully Moreno, Santiago Arrieta and Oscar Valicelli. The script was written by Carlos Adén.

Plot 
María (Legrand), a servant girl, idolizes her glamorous older sister Gloria (Moreno), who is a model. When they fall in love with the same man, Gloria must sacrifice herself.

Cast
 Silvia Legrand as María 
 Zully Moreno as Gloria Morea
 Santiago Arrieta as Ricardo Olmedo
 Oscar Valicelli as Domingo Requena
 Semillita as Pocholo 
 Herminia Mas as Doña Antonia
 Guillermo Pedemonte 
 Warly Ceriani

Reception
For La Nación, it was a "comedy with a simple theme, exhibiting most pleasingly the virtue of good taste in regard to its dramatic and scenic features" while Calki in El Mundo writes: "everything is smoothly presented, resolving the conflict... by means of an abundance of dialogue. This is no doubt intended to show poetically that by keeping to the road, sentimental kitch can be avoided.

References

External links
 

1943 films
1940s Spanish-language films
Films directed by Enrique Cahen Salaberry
Argentine romantic comedy films
1943 romantic comedy films
1940s Argentine films